De Werf was an arts center and jazz record label (W.E.R.F.) in Bruges, Belgium. In 2002, the label released an eleven-CD box set titled The Finest of Belgian Jazz, with music by Greetings from Mercury, Aka Moon, Brussels Jazz Orchestra, and Kris Defoort. Rik Bevernage, De Werf's main collaborator, received an award at the 2002 Golden Django ceremony.

In 2017, De Werf and Vrijstaat O (Ostend) merged into a new organisation, KAAP. The W.E.R.F. record label continues its activities under the original name.

De Werf has its own concert hall where many jazz bands perform. There are also theatre pieces and events for children. In February 2009, public funding for the venue was removed because the club didn't produce relevant or up-to-date concerts and theatre performances, making a closure of De Werf from 31 December 2009 likely. However, new productions continued in 2014.

W.E.R.F. Discography

1993–1999
 K. D.'s Basement Party : Sketches of Belgium (1993)
 Octurn : Chromatic History (1994)
 K.D.'s Decade : K.D.'s Decade Live (1994)
 Kris Defoort and Fabrizio Cassol : Variations on A Love Supreme (1995)
 Joe Fonda, Carlo Morena, and Jeff Hirshfield : What We're Hearing (1996)
 Octurn : Ocean (1997)
 Bart Defoort Quartet : Moving (1997)
 The Fonda/Stevens Group : Live from Bruges (1997)
 Laurent Blondiau Quintet : The Queen of the Apple Pie (1998)
 Chris Joris Experience: Live 1997 (1998)
 Ernst Vranckx Quartet featuring Kenny Wheeler : A Child's Blessing (1998)
 Kris Defoort Quartet and Kris Defoort & Dreamtime : Passages (1999)
 Frank Vaganée Trio featuring John Ruocco : Two Trios (1999)
 Ode for Joe : Caribbean Fire Dance (1999)
 Brussels Jazz Orchestra : The September Sessions (1999)

2000
 Ben Sluijs Quartet : Candy Century
 Octurn : Round
 Joe Fonda, Carlo Morena and Jeff Hirshfield : Step-In
 Mark Dresser and Mark Elias : The Marks Brothers

2001
 Ernst Vranckx Quintet : Songs & Dances
 Ben Sluijs Quartet : Seasounds
 Erik Vermeulen trio : Songs of Minutes
 Rêve d'éléphant Orchestra : Racines Du Ciel
 Christoph Erbstösser Trio : Vive Les Etrangers
 Trio Grande : Signé Trio Grande

2002 
 Various artists : The Finest in Belgian Jazz (11-CD box set) with :
 Brussels Jazz Orchestra : The Music of Bert Joris
 Greetings from Mercury : Heiwa
 Aka Moon : Guitars
 Nathalie Loriers Trio + Extensions : Tombouctou
 Octurn : Dimensions
 Ben Sluijs Quartet : Flying Circles
 Philip Catherine : Summer Night
 Bert Joris Quartet : Live
 Erik Vermeulen trio : Inner City
 Kris Defoort, Mark Turner, Nicolas Thys and Jim Black : Sound Plaza

2003
 The Chris Joris Experience : Out of the Night
 Bart Defoort Quartet : The Lizard Game
 Jan De Haas Quintet: Doing My Thing

2004
 Mahieu-Vantomme Quartet : Whatever
 Rêve d'éléphant Orchestra : Lobster Caravan
 André Goudbeek, Xu Fengxia, and Joe Fonda : Separate Realities
 High Voltage : Hoppin' Around
 Koen De Cauter, Fapy Lafertin, Patrick Saussois, Joop Ayal, Tcha Limberger, Waso De Cauter, and Dajo De Cauter : Django!

2005
 Ben Sluijs Quartet : True Nature
 Kris Defoort, Koen Kessels, Claron McFadden & Dreamtime : ConVerSations/ConSerVations
 Hendrik Braeckman, Bert Joris, Kurt Van Herck, Piet Verbist & Jan de Haas : til now
 Bart Maris, Zeger Vandenbussche, Mathias Van de Wiele, Dajo De Cauter & Giovanni Barcella : Konglong

2006
 Fabrizio Cassol, Bart Defoort, Michel Massot, Stéphane Galland & Kris Defoort : Live at The Werf
 Robin Verheyen, Harmen Fraanje, Clemens van der Feen & Flin van Hemmen : Narcissus 
 Nathalie Loriers, Sal La Rocca, Hans Van Oosterhout : Silent Spring
 Peer Baierlein, Ewout Pierreux, David Petrocca & Yves Peeters : Open Questions
 Brussels Jazz Orchestra : Countermove
 Nathalie Loriers & Chemins Croisés : L'arbre pleure
 Ben Sluijs, Jeroen Van Herzeele, Manolo Cabras & Marek Patrman : Somewhere in Between
 Eric Person, Bob Stewart, Fabian Fioriini, Reggie Washington, Chris Mentens, Baba Sissoko, Junior Mthombeni & Chris Joris : Rainbow Country
 Bart Quartier, Nico Schepers, Bart Defoort, Jean-Louis Rassinfosse & Jan de Haas : Thank You
 Laurent Blondiau, Jeroen Van Herzeele, Jean-Yves Evrard, Jozef Dumoulin, Sébastien Boisseau, Eric Thielemans, guest(s), Sophie Kokaj & Samanta7 : 5

2007
 Pierre Van Dormael & Octurn : North Country Suite
 Saxafabra & Cezariusz Gadzina : Saxafabra
 Songs for Broadcast : RadioKUKAorkest

See also
 List of record labels

External links
 Official site

Belgian independent record labels
Record labels established in 1993
Belgian jazz
Jazz record labels